Radstadion was a velodrome located in Olympiapark in Munich, Germany. They hosted the track portion of the cycling competitions for the 1972 Summer Olympics.

Demolition and new arena
The Radstadion was demolished in 2015 to make way for a new multi-purpose arena. The SAP Garden should offer a maximum of 11,500 seats and should cost around 100 million euros. It will be the new home of the ice hockey club EHC Red Bull München and the basketball team of Bayern Munich. The construction of the new arena should begin in the winter of 2019 with the groundbreaking ceremony. In the late summer of 2021, the SAP Garden should be completed. The new building is designed by Danish architects 3XN. The costs are borne by the owner of the EHC Red Bull München, the Red Bull GmbH.

References

External links

 information at FixedGearFever.com
1972 Summer Olympics official report. Volume 2. Part 2. pp. 187–88.

Venues of the 1972 Summer Olympics
Sports venues in Bavaria
Velodromes in Germany
Cycle racing in Germany
Olympic cycling venues
Buildings and structures in Munich
Sports venues demolished in 2015